Andrés Felipe Pineda Barajas (born 27 March 1992) is a Colombian footballer.

Career statistics

Club

Notes

References

1992 births
Living people
Colombian footballers
Colombian expatriate footballers
Association football forwards
Centauros Villavicencio footballers
La Equidad footballers
Monagas S.C. players
Millonarios F.C. players
Platense F.C. players
Llaneros F.C. players
Liga Nacional de Fútbol Profesional de Honduras players
Categoría Primera B players
Colombian expatriate sportspeople in Venezuela
Expatriate footballers in Venezuela
Colombian expatriate sportspeople in Honduras
Expatriate footballers in Honduras
People from Villavicencio